Simmons v. Himmelreich, 578 U.S. ___ (2016), was a United States Supreme Court case regarding inmates suing under the Federal Tort Claims Act (FTCA).

Opinion of the Court 
Associate Justice Sonia Sotomayor authored the unanimous decision holding that Himmelreich's second lawsuit can proceed, even after the first suit was dismissed under an exception to the Federal Tort Claims Act.

References

External links
 
 SCOTUSblog coverage

United States Supreme Court cases
United States Supreme Court cases of the Roberts Court
2016 in United States case law